Eilema persephone is a moth of the subfamily Arctiinae. It was described by Hervé de Toulgoët in 1965. It is found on Madagascar.

References

 

persephone
Moths described in 1965